Anisynta is a genus of  butterflies in the family Hesperiidae (subfamily Trapezitinae). The species of the genus Anisynta are found in the Australasian realm.

Species
Anisynta sphenosema Meyrick & Lower, 1902
Anisynta cynone Hewitson, 1874
Anisynta tillyardi Waterhouse & Lyell, 1912
Anisynta monticolae Olliff, 1890
Anisynta dominula Plötz, 1884

References
Natural History Museum Lepidoptera genus database
Anisynta at funet

Trapezitinae
Hesperiidae genera